Horsfieldia crux-melitensis is a species of plant in the family Myristicaceae. It is endemic to Papua New Guinea.

References

Flora of Papua New Guinea
crux-melitensis
Data deficient plants
Taxonomy articles created by Polbot